Nellie Lathrop Helm (October 1, 1859 – July 12, 1940) was an American author. A River Journey was reviewed in The Elementary School Teacher.

References

External links

1859 births
1940 deaths
19th-century American writers
20th-century American writers
19th-century American women writers
20th-century American women writers